Sihar Pangihutan Hamonangan Sitorus Pane (born 12 July 1968) is an Indonesian politician and businessman who is a member of the People's Representative Council. He took part in the 2018 North Sumatra gubernatorial election as a vice-governor candidate to Djarot Saiful Hidayat.

Biography
Sitorus was born in Jakarta on 12 July 1968, and studied there until he graduated from high school in 1987. Afterwards, he earned a bachelor's degree in business administration from the University of Arizona in 1991, then a MBA from Creighton University in 1993. After his studies, he began to work at Freeport Indonesia as an accountant until 1995, then for a time at the Indonesian Stock Exchange.

His later business includes an oil palm plantation in Maluku. He also owns F.C.V. Dender E.H., a Belgian Division 1 football club.

In 2018, he ran as the running mate of Djarot Saiful Hidayat for the 2018 North Sumatra gubernatorial election, the pair being defeated by Edy Rahmayadi and Musa Rajekshah. He then was elected into the People's Representative Council in the 2019 legislative election, representing North Sumatra's 2nd electoral district.

References

Living people
1968 births
Indonesian Democratic Party of Struggle politicians
People from Jakarta
Batak people
University of Arizona alumni
Creighton University alumni
Indonesian businesspeople
Members of the People's Representative Council, 2019